John Blaine may refer to:

 John J. Blaine (1875–1934), American lawyer and politician
John Blaine, pseudonym for authors Harold L. Goodwin (all titles) and Peter J. Harkins

See also
John Blain (disambiguation)